Mitsuaki (written: , , ,  or ) is a masculine Japanese given name. Notable people with the name include:

, Japanese actor and voice actor
, Japanese photographer
, Japanese footballer
, Japanese voice actor
, Japanese handball player
, Japanese basketball player and women's basketball coach
, Japanese water polo player
, Japanese virologist

Japanese masculine given names